The 1999 Embassy World Professional Darts Championship was held from 2–10 January 1999 at the Lakeside Country Club in Frimley Green, Surrey.

Defending champion Raymond van Barneveld retained his title with victory over Ronnie Baxter in another thrilling final which, like the previous year's decider against Richie Burnett, went to the final set and a tiebreak. Baxter had led at various points throughout the match and missed crucial darts at doubles in the final set. Barneveld became the first player to retain the Embassy World Championship since Eric Bristow won it in three consecutive years in 1984, 1985 and 1986.

The standout match of this championship, however, was the quarter-final between Chris Mason and Martin Adams. Adams looked set for victory when he led 4–1 in sets, but he missed nine darts for the match, and this opened the door for Mason to stage a huge comeback, forcing a final-set tiebreak. Finally, Adams missed a double one which would have forced a sudden-death leg, and Mason hit it to secure a remarkable win. This match also saw no fewer than 29 180s - 16 for Adams and 13 for Mason.

Seeds
  Raymond van Barneveld
  Ronnie Baxter
  Colin Monk
  Graham Hunt
  Ritchie Davies
  Mervyn King
  Roland Scholten
  Steve Duke

Prize money
The prize money was £148,400.

Champion: £42,000
Runner-Up: £21,000
Semi-Finalists (2): £9,400
Quarter-Finalists (4): £4,750
Last 16 (8): £3,600
Last 32 (16): £2,350

There was also a 9 Dart Checkout prize of £52,000, along with a High Checkout prize of £2,000.

The Results

References

BDO World Darts Championships
BDO World Darts Championship
BDO World Darts Championship
BDO World Darts Championship
Sport in Surrey
Frimley Green